Əhmədbəyli or Akhmedbeyli may refer to:
Əhmədbəyli, Fizuli, Azerbaijan
Əhmədbəyli, Saatly, Azerbaijan
Əhmədbəyli, Samukh, Azerbaijan